Mae Tuen is a tambon (subdistrict) of Omkoi District, in Chiang Mai Province, Thailand. In 2017 it had a population of 10,521 people.

Administration

Central administration
The tambon is divided into 16 administrative villages (mubans).

Local administration
The area of the subdistrict is covered by the subdistrict administrative organization (SAO) Mae Tuen (องค์การบริหารส่วนตำบลแม่ตื่น).

References

External links
Thaitambon.com on Mae Tuen

Tambon of Chiang Mai province
Populated places in Chiang Mai province